The London Government Act 1899 (62 & 63 Vict. c. 14) was an Act of the Parliament of the United Kingdom that reformed the administration of the capital. The Act divided the County of London into 28 metropolitan boroughs, replacing the 41 parish vestries and District Boards of Works administering the area. The legislation also transferred a few powers from the London County Council to the boroughs, and removed a number of boundary anomalies. The first elections to the new boroughs were held on 1 November 1900.

Background
While an elected London County Council had been created by the Local Government Act 1888, the lower tier of local government still consisted of elective vestries and District boards of works created in 1855 by the Metropolis Management Act. In addition there were a number of areas outside the jurisdiction of any local authority.

In 1893, a Royal Commission on the Unification of London had been established with the purpose of making proposals on the amalgamation of the City of London with the county. In its report in 1894, the Commission recommended increasing the power of the County Council over the vestries and boards, with county councillors becoming ex officio members of the lower authorities, and the LCC gaining powers to frame by-laws to govern them.

In reaction to the report, the vestries sought a strengthening of the second tier of government in the capital. Charters of incorporation as a municipal borough were sought in 1896–1897 by Paddington vestry, the parishes of the City of Westminster and in Kensington.

The London Municipal Society had been formed in 1894 to support the pro-Unionist Moderate candidates in London local elections. The stated policy of the Society at the 1897 vestry elections was "conferring on the local authorities of the metropolis municipal dignity and privileges". In July the Society urged the Government to introduce legislation to create municipalities in London.

In February 1898, a deputation attended the Prime Minister, Lord Salisbury, and presented him with a memorial calling for municipal government in London. The common seals of nineteen vestries were affixed to the document. Later in the year two private bills to create boroughs in London were introduced to the Commons, one by the member of parliament for Islington West, Thomas Lough, and the second by a group of London local authorities.

The Bill
The London Government Bill was introduced to the House of Commons of the United Kingdom on 1 March 1899, by Arthur Balfour, Leader of the House. It provided for the division of the administrative county of London, except the City of London, into metropolitan boroughs. Each borough was to be governed by a borough council consisting of a mayor, aldermen and councillors, the total number of which was not to exceed seventy-two.

The Bill did not define areas for all the boroughs, but denoted sixteen existing parishes or districts that should become boroughs: 
The parishes of Battersea, Camberwell, Chelsea, Fulham, Hammersmith, Hampstead, Islington, Kensington, Lambeth, Lewisham, Paddington, St Marylebone and St Pancras
The districts of Poplar and Wandsworth
The ancient parliamentary borough of Westminster

The remaining boroughs were to be made up of combinations of existing authorities with a rateable value exceeding 500,000 pounds or with a population of between 100,000 and 400,000 inhabitants.

The debate
The parliamentary debate centred on three issues: the boundaries of the boroughs, the need for aldermen on the councils and the admission of women to the councils.

Boundaries
Concern was voiced in the Commons by Thomas Lough and Richard Haldane (MP for Haddingtonshire (UK Parliament constituency) in Scotland) about the fact that the boundaries of the boroughs not listed in the Bill were to be fixed by boundary commissioners without parliamentary oversight. The conditions for constituting boroughs were altered with rateable value only being considered where the population was less than 100,000, allowing the commissioners to consider the creation of smaller boroughs.
Sydney Buxton (MP for Tower Hamlets, Poplar) was concerned that the upper population limit would lead to very large boroughs being formed in the east of London.

In the Lords, debate on the boundaries continued. An amendment by Lord Tweedmouth to ensure that the "Tower of London, and the liberties thereof" was included in the schedule with the area of the Whitechapel District was accepted. A second, unsuccessful, amendment was tabled by the Peer to divide the Wandsworth District into two boroughs: one comprising the parishes of Wandsworth and Putney; and the other Clapham, Streatham and Tooting. Lord Tweedmouth felt the area of the proposed borough was unwieldy, and his division was a natural one by means of Wandsworth Common. Lord Hawkesbury felt that the area of the parliamentary borough of Westminster was "far too large to be economically worked", and sought to divide it into two. The amendment was defeated.

Aldermen
Edward Pickersgill, member for Bethnal Green South West moved to have aldermen removed from the borough councils. This was partly because he disagreed with aldermen on principle, but also because the creation of 400 or 500 new aldermen would "make the institution ridiculous and would accelerate its extinction". The amendment was defeated, with 140 votes for and 245 against.

Women members
Edmund Boulnois, member for Marylebone East moved an amendment to ban women from being mayors, aldermen or councillors of the new boroughs. Women had been elected members and chairmen of the existing vestries and district boards, and it followed that they could be elected to the new councils. Mr Boulnois believed that the work of the councils would be "distasteful to women" and that it would be "a pity to drag women into the turmoil of an election on political lines". He reminded members "If they allowed women to sit on these councils they would not be able to withhold from them the Parliamentary franchise and the right to sit and vote in that house." The amendment was carried with a majority of 102. This was not the end of the issue, however. On 6 June at the report stage an amendment was carried allowing women to be councillors or aldermen (but not mayors) of the metropolitan boroughs. This was overturned during the second reading on a motion by Lord Dunraven
in the House of Lords on 26 June. The Lords amendment was accepted by the Commons on 6 July by a majority of 243 to 174.

The Bill received the royal assent on 13 July.

Metropolitan boroughs
Section 1 of the act stated "The whole of the administrative county of London, excluding the city of London, shall be divided into metropolitan boroughs".  The boroughs were to be divided into wards, with three councillors for each ward. There were also to be alderman at a ratio of one to every six councillors. This followed the practice for the London County Council, rather than municipal boroughs, where the ratio was one alderman for every three councillors.  The first election of councillors was set for 1 November 1900, with a third of the councillors going out of office each year. The chairman of the council was to have the title of mayor.
Unlike the municipal boroughs which received this status by the grant of a charter of incorporation, the metropolitan boroughs had no charters, being created by act of parliament.

Powers transferred to the boroughs
Section 4 (1) provided that every elected vestry and district board in the county of London would cease to exist, with the powers, properties and liabilities of the abolished authorities transferring to the metropolitan boroughs.

Section 5 (1) transferred a few minor functions to the boroughs from the London County Council.  These were concerned with the licensing of dairymen, removal of obstructions and unauthorised signs and the licensing of wooden structures.  The boroughs were also allowed to exercise some powers concurrently with the county council within their own boundaries: these involved the demolition of buildings, the regulation of water companies, the power to acquire land, the housing of the working classes and the power to make byelaws.

By section 6 (1), all main roads within a borough were transferred to their charge.

The act allowed for the London County Council and the metropolitan boroughs to transfer powers to and from each other, if both the county council and a majority of the boroughs agreed. A similar mechanism was included in the act in regard to the county council and the common council of the City of London.

Other measures

Detached parts of parishes
Every part of a parish in the county of London that was wholly detached from the principal part of the parish was to be annexed or divided to the borough which it adjoined. Any detached part of another county surrounded by the county of London was to be transferred to the latter county, and incorporated into a metropolitan borough, while any part of the county of London surrounded by another county was to be similarly transferred.

Notable examples of parishes effected were:
 South Hornsey, in Middlesex which consisted of two detached pieces entirely surrounded by the county of London, which was incorporated into the metropolitan borough of Stoke Newington
 Alexandra Park, an exclave of the parish of Clerkenwell and county of London, locally in Middlesex, which was transferred to the parish of Hornsey in the latter county.
 Chelsea and Kensington, both within the county of London had detached pieces adjoining or surrounded by the other parish, which were exchanged.

Woolwich local board
A local board had been formed in Woolwich parish in 1852.  It was the only parish in the metropolitan area to adopt legislation forming such a body. The board had a unique constitution, with some members elected and others nominated by the superintendent of the Royal Navy dockyard, the commanding officers of the Royal Engineers and the Royal Artillery, and the storekeeper of Her Majesty's Ordnance. The local board was dissolved by section 19 of the Act, with its powers passing to the metropolitan borough of Woolwich.

Penge
Penge was a detached part of the parish of Battersea, several miles from its parent parish, administered by the Lewisham District Board, and on the edge of the county of London as created in 1889. Section 20 of the Act sought to deal with this anomaly. It allowed an Order in Council to either incorporate the township into either of the metropolitan boroughs of Lewisham or Camberwell, or to form it into an urban district in one or other of the counties of Surrey or Kent. In the event, Penge became an urban district in Kent.

Kensington Palace
Section 21 allowed for Kensington Palace to be detached from the borough of Westminster and be transferred to the borough of Kensington by Order in Council, which was duly done. The presence of the palace with the borough led indirectly to its acquisition of "royal" status in 1901.

The Temples
The Inner Temple and Middle Temple were deemed to be part of the City of London for the purposes of the act.

Areas of the Metropolitan Boroughs
Schedule 1 of the Act described the area of each of the 28 boroughs to be created. It did not give them names. Where the borough consisted of a single parish, or followed the area of a parliamentary constituency then it would take its name. In other cases, an "appropriate name" was to be given to the borough by Order in Council.

Sources
 London Government Act 1899 
 Guide to the Local Administrative Units of England, Vol. 1, Frederic Youngs, London, 1979

References

United Kingdom Acts of Parliament 1899
Local government legislation in England and Wales
History of local government in London (1889–1965)
1899 in London
Acts of the Parliament of the United Kingdom concerning London